Talal Selhami (born 11 March 1982), is a Franco–Moroccan filmmaker. He is best known as the director of the films Mirages (2010) and Achoura (2018), and an associate producer of the documentary film Creature Designers - The Frankenstein Complex (2015).

Personal life
he was born on 11 March 1982 in Neuilly-sur-Seine, Hauts-de-Seine in France as the youngest son of the family. His father, Mohamed Selhami is a Moroccan journalist and founder of the newspaper Maroc Hebdo International. He completed a master's degree in arts and entertainment, specializing in production, at the University of Paris 1 Pantheon-Sorbonne.

Career
In 2005, he made his maiden short Sinistra. After the success of the short, he made the short Partir en smoke in 2007. In 2010, he made his first feature film, Mirages. The film officially represented in Marrakech International Film Festival in 2010 and the Tangier National Film Festival in 2011. The film later won two awards: For Best Image and Best Female Interpretation. At the Brussels International Fantastic Film Festival (BIFFF) in Brussels, 2011 she film received a Special Jury Prize. 

In December 2018, he released his film Achoura, La nuit des enfants as a Franco-Moroccan joint production. The film was screened in fifteen festivals around the world: including, the Paris International Fantastic Film Festival, the international fantastic film festival in Brussels, the Bucheon International Fantastic Film Festival (BiFan) in South Korea and the Neuchâtel International Fantastic Film Festival (NIFFF) in Neuchâtel. Later in 2019, Talal received the prize for the Best Production at the Tangier National Film Festival as well as the Jury Special Mention at the Sitges Film Festival. Meanwhile, the film also awarded the Best Film Award at the HARD:LINE International Film Festival in Germany.

Filmography

References

External links
 

Living people
1982 births
Moroccan people by ethnic or national origin
French film directors
French film producers